Arnold Schwarzenegger's Total Body Workout is a 1983 musical compilation. The album has significant camp value amongst music collectors today due to Schwarzenegger's well recognised thick Austrian accent issuing fitness instructions layered on top of several 1980s feelgood hits such as Journey's "Don't Stop Believin'" and The Weather Girls "It's Raining Men".

Track listing

 "Save The Overtime For Me" – Gladys Knight & The Pips (5:40)6
 "Don't Stop Believin'" – Journey (2:25)
 "867-5309/Jenny" – Tommy Tutone (3:37)
 "Let Your Body Rock" – Champaign (1:26)
 "Love Not War" – Michael Case Kissel (3:47)
 "Think I'm In Love" – Eddie Money (1:25)
 "I'm So Proud" – Deniece Williams (3:55)
 "Save The Overtime For Me" – Gladys Knight & The Pips (5:39)
 "It's Raining Men" – The Weather Girls (2:51)
 "Let Your Body Rock" – Champaign"* (3:48)
 "Love Not War" – Michael Case Kissel* (4:58)
 "Burning For You" – Blue Oyster Cult (2:37)
 "I'm So Proud" – Deniece Williams* (3:53)
 Alternative workout instructions are provided in these tracks.

References

1983 compilation albums
Pop compilation albums
Rock compilation albums
Pop rock compilation albums